Ngoma may refer to:

Places
 Ngoma, Namibia, a settlement on the border between Namibia and Botswana
 Ngoma, Rulindo, Northern Province, Rwanda
 Ngoma, Uganda, a municipality in Nakaseke District
 Ngoma, Ukerewe, a ward in Ukerewe District, Tanzania
 Ngoma, Zambia, headquarters of Kafue National Park, Zambiq, and its airstrip:
Ngoma Airport
 Ngoma District, Rwanda district in East Province, centred on Kibungo

Other things by the same name
 Ngoma (surname), a Congolese and Zambian surname
 Ngoma music about Ngoma music of Tanzania and the Great Lakes
 Ngoma (leafhopper), a leafhopper genus in the tribe Erythroneurini
 Ngoma (record label), an African local record company based in the Democratic Republic of the Congo
 Ngoma drums, used by certain Bantu populations of Africa
 Ngoma, an alternate term for the yuka (music) family of drums used in the music of Cuba